Anebolithus is a genus of trilobites found in Gilwern Hill, Powys, Wales. Anebolithus, like other trinucleids, was blind.

References

Trinucleidae
Asaphida genera
Fossils of Great Britain
Fossils of Wales
Powys

Paleontology in Wales